Wilhelm Weiss (3 February 1859 – 18 June 1904) was an Austro-Hungarian mathematician.

Weiss received his early education from his father, who was a teacher at Řitka; and from 1881 to 1887 he studied successively at the universities of Prague, Leipsic, and Erlangen, from where he obtained his Ph.D. in 1887. From 1901 to 1902 he was dean of the school of engineers at the same institution. He taught there until his death in June 1904.

References
 

1859 births
1904 deaths
Austrian Jews
Austro-Hungarian Jews
Czech Jews
Leipzig University alumni
Mathematicians from Prague
University of Erlangen-Nuremberg alumni
People from Prague-West District